Ettore Bianco is a former Italian racing driver. He entered 48 races between 1934 and 1952 in Fiat's and Maserati's, he started 37 of them. In 1937 he was a works driver for Officine Alfieri Maserati. Among his best results were three second places and four third places.

Complete results

References

Italian racing drivers
Sports car racing
Mille Miglia drivers